Dixie Dynamite is a 1976 American film directed by Lee Frost that stars Warren Oates. Steve McQueen appears uncredited in a scene as a motorbike driver.

Plot
A man who makes liquor illegally from a still is in cahoots with the sheriff, who then double-crosses him. The moonshiner is shot dead by the sheriff's deputy. His two daughters decide to take over the family business, but when the sheriff and a corrupt local banker disrupt their operation and eventually destroy their still, the girls, aided by local motorcross rider Mack, decide to get even.

Cast
 Warren Oates as Mack
 Christopher George as Sheriff Marsh
 Jane Anne Johnstone as Dixie
 Kathy McHaley as Patsy
 R. G. Armstrong as Charlie White
 Stanley Adams as Dade McCrutchen
 Mark Miller as Tom Eldridge
 Wes Bishop as Deputy Frank

Soundtrack

 The soundtrack is by Jerry Styner and Porter Jordan, with music performed by Duane Eddy and the Mike Curb Congregation

Home video
Dixie Dynamite was released on DVD on January 29, 2002 as a Region 1 disc by Vci Mod.

References

External links

Trailer at YouTube

1976 action films
1976 films
Films directed by Lee Frost
Films scored by Jerry Styner
American action films
Dimension Pictures films
1970s English-language films
1970s American films